Xanthopastis moctezuma is a moth of the family Noctuidae. It is found from Mexico north to Brownsville, Texas, but appears to be replaced by Xanthopastis regnatrix elsewhere in Texas.

The species is characterized by the more broken black patch on the forewing, which forms an irregular series of dots on the outer side of the reniform spot, the much larger process on the inner surface of the right valve.

References

Moths described in 1913
Glottulinae